WMFT (88.9 FM, "Moody Radio South") is a non-commercial educational radio station licensed to serve Tuscaloosa, Alabama, United States.  The station, which began licensed broadcasting in 2005, is owned by the Moody Bible Institute of Chicago.

WMFT broadcasts a religious radio format. The station derives a significant portion of its programming from Moody Radio.

History
This station received its original construction permit from the Federal Communications Commission on June 11, 2002.  The new station was assigned the call letters WMFT by the FCC on July 13, 2004.

WMFT launched regular programming on June 13, 2005.  The station received its license to cover from the FCC on December 22, 2005.

This full-power station replaced a 10-watt broadcast translator that retransmitted the programming of sister station WMBV in Dixons Mills, Alabama.

References

External links
WMFT official website

Radio stations established in 2005
Tuscaloosa, Alabama
Moody Radio
MFT
2005 establishments in Alabama